Lullaia or Lullaya, inscribed in cuneiform phonetically mlu-ul-la-a-a, a hypocoristic name, was the 53rd king of Assyria to be added to the Assyrian King List. He was a “son of a nobody,” i.e. unrelated to a previous monarch, and reigned six years, from  1621–1616 BC, during a quiet and uneventful period in Assyrian history. Reade speculates that he may be identified with the earlier king, Aššūr-dugul, on the basis of their similar lengths of reign and lack of royal parentage.

Biography 
He was the last in the sequence of kings omitted from the dissident Assyrian Kinglist known as KAV 14, which otherwise provides the only extant sequence of Shamshi-Adad I’s later successors, Mut-Ashkur and Rimush. The Synchronistic Kinglist gives his Babylonian counterpart as Ayadaragalama of the Sealand Dynasty. There are no extant inscriptions from Lullaia's or his predecessor's reigns in marked contrast with their Sealand contemporaries.

He was succeeded by Shu-Ninua, the son of his predecessor, Bazaya, for whom he may have acted as regent until reaching his majority as there is no tradition that Lullaia was a usurper.

Inscriptions

References 

17th-century BC Assyrian kings